This article is a list of people that have been proclaimed venerable, based on the recognition of their heroic virtues, by Pope Francis. Since his 2013 election to the papacy, 499 people have been proclaimed as such.

2013

March 27, 2013
Angelo Fontanarosa (1881-1966)
Antoine Kowalczyk, O.M.I. (1893-1947)
Eladio Mozas Santamera (1837-1897)
Manuel Aparici Navarro (1902-1964)
Moises Lira Serafin, M.S.P.S. (1893-1950)
Olinto Marella (1882-1969)
Sílvia Cardoso Ferreira da Silva (1882-1950)

May 2, 2013
Joaquim Rosselló i Ferrà (1833-1909)
Teresa Janina Kierocińska (1885-1946)

June 3, 2013
Giulia Crostarosa (1696-1755)
João de Oliveira Matos Ferreira (1879-1962)
Nicola Mazza (1790-1865)
Teresa Toda Juncosa (1826-1898)

July 5, 2013
Bernardo Felipe Fromental (1895-1978)
Carmen Elena Rendiles Martínez (1903-1977)
Giuseppe Lazzati (1909-1986)
Maria Isabel Caldeira (1889-1962)
Nicola D'Onofrio (1943-1964)

October 9, 2013
Amato Ronconi, O.F.S. (1226-1292)
Angela Giorgi (1882-1945)
Attilio Giordani, A.S.C. (1913-1972)
Marie-Élisabeth Turgeon (1840-1881)
Mary Jane Wilson (1840-1916)
Pio Alberto del Corona, O.P. (1837-1912)

October 31, 2013
Celestina Bottego (1895-1980)
Nano Nagle (1718-1784)
Olga Gugelmo (1910-1943)

December 9, 2013
Clemente Fuhl (1874-1935)
Marcell Boldizsar Marton (1877-1966)
Maurice-Marie-Matthieu Garrigou (1766-1852)
Maria Oliva Bonaldo (1893-1976)
Maria Orsola Rivata (1897-1987)
Maria Rosa Teresa Gay Tibau (1813-1884)
Orsola Mezzini (1853-1919)
Raphael Cordero (1790-1868)
Romano Bottegal, O.C.S.O. (1921-1978)
Rosalie Cadron-Jetté, S.M. (1794-1864)

December 17, 2013
Jerzy Ciesielski (1929-1970)
Manuel Herranz Estables (1880-1968)

2014

January 27, 2014
Elisabetta Sanna Porcu, O.F.S. (1788-1857)
Giuseppe Girelli (1886-1978)
Marie-Anne-Marcelle Mallet (1805-1871)
Maria Benita Arias (1822-1894)
Noeme Cinque (1913-1988)
Virginia de Brincat (1862-1952)
Zakarias Salterain Bizkarra (1887-1957)

February 7, 2014
Guglielmo Giacomo Ghilardi (1858-1937)
Jesús María Echavarría Aguirre (1858-1954)
Maria Rafaela Rodriguez Suarez De La Guardia (1923-1956)

April 3, 2014
Adolfo Barberis (1884-1967)
Francisco Simon Rodenas (1849-1914)
Joseph Staub (1876-1936)
Juana Clara de la Concepción Sanchez Garcia (1902-1973)
Luigi Rocchi (1932-1979)
Maria Dulce Rodrigues dos Santos (1901-1972)
Maria Josephina Teresa Marcucci (1888-1960)
Sebastian Elorza Arizmendi (1882-1942)

April 15, 2014
Alain-Marie Guynot de Boismenu, M.S.C. (1870-1953)
Wilhelm Janauschek (1859-1926)

May 9, 2014
Caroline-Barbe Colchen Carré de Malberg (1829-1891)
Giacomo Abbondo (1720-1788)
Jacint Alegre i Pujals (1874-1930)

June 12, 2014
Eugenio Reffo,  (1843-1925)
Frances Margaret Taylor, P.S.M.G. (1832-1900)
Itala Mela, O.S.B. (1904-1957)
Luigi Savaré (1878-1949)
Giuseppa Scandola, M.S.V. (1849-1903)
Uberto Mori, T.O.S.F. (1926-1989)

July 8, 2014
Antônio Ferreira Viçoso, C.M. (1787-1875)
Auguste Arribat (1879-1963)
Elena Da Persico (1869-1948)
Marcello Candia (1916-1983)
Maria Carlotta Fontana (1870-1935)
Saturnino López Novoa (1830-1905)
Veronica of the Passion, O.C.D. (1823-1906)

November 7, 2014
Hildebrand Gregori, O.S.B. Silv. (1894-1985)
Jeanne Mance (1606-1673)
John Sullivan,  S.J. (1861-1933)
Marthe Robin (1902-1981)
Maximiliano Valdés Subercaseaux, O.F.M. Cap. (1908-1982)
Pelágio Sauter, C.Ss.R (1878-1961)
Raimundo Calcagno (1888-1964)
Silvio Dissegna (1967-1979)

December 6, 2014
Elisabetta Tasca Serena (1899-1978)
Francesca Paola Prestigiacomo (1858-1948)
María Séiquer Gayá (1891-1975)
Marie Vojtěcha Hasmandová (1914-1988)
Praxedes Fernandez Garcia (1886-1936)

2015

January 22, 2015
Aloysius Schwartz (1930-1992)
Cointa Jauregui Oses (1875-1954)
Elisabeth Maria Satoko Kitahara (1929-1958)
Luis De Trelles y Nuogerol (1819-1891)
Teresa Luisa Gardi, O.F.S. (1769-1837)
Virginia Blanco Tardío (1916-1990)
Władysław Bukowiński (1904-1974)

February 3, 2015
Giovanni Bacile (1880-1941)

March 18, 2015
Elisa Baldo Foresti (1862-1926)
Francesco Gattola (1822-1899)
Jadwiga Jaroszewska (1900-1937)
Juana de la Cruz Vázquez Gutiérrez, T.O.R. (1481-1534)
Maria Orsola Bussone (1954-1970)
Mary Aikenhead (1787-1858)
Petar Barbarić, S.J. (1874-1897)

May 5, 2015
Ante Antić (1893-1965)
Brigida Maria Postorino (1865-1960)
Domenica Bedonni Bernardini (1889-1971)
Jacinto Vera (1813-1881)
Juliette Colbert de Barolo (1786-1864)
Rafaela Martinez-Cañavate Ballesteros (1915-1991)
Sergio Bernardini (1882-1966)

June 5, 2015
Antonio Celona (1873-1952)
Marcello Labor (1890-1954)
Ottorino Zanon (1915-1972)
Rachele Lalia (1839-1914)

July 16, 2015
Agostino Ramírez Barba (1881-1967)
Andrey Sheptytsky, O.S.B.M. (1865-1944)
Elisa Miceli (1904-1976)
Giuseppe Carraro (1899-1980)
Isabel Méndez Herrero,  (1924-1953)
Maria del Rifugio Aguilar y Torres (1866-1937)
Marie-Teresa Dupouy Bordes,  (1873-1953)
Simpliciano Maresca, O.F.M. (1827-1898)

September 30, 2015
Antonio Filomeno Maria Losito (1838-1917)
Franciszek Blachnicki (1921-1987)
Giovanni Folci (1890-1963)
Hanna Helena Chrzanowska, O.S.B. (1902-1973)
Jose Rivera Ramírez (1925-1991)
Juan Manuel Martín del Campo (1917-1996)
Maria Benedetta Frey (1836-1913)

December 14, 2015
Angelo Ramazzotti (1800-1861)
Emanuela Maria Maddalena Kalb (1899-1986)
Giovanni Schiavo,  (1903-1967)
José María Arizmendiarrieta (1915-1976)
Joseph Vithayathil (1865-1964)
María Emilia Riquelme y Zayas (1847-1940)
Maria Speranza della Croce (1890-1967)
Nicola Wolf (1756-1832)
Teresa Rosa Ferdinanda de Saldanha Oliveira y Sousa (1837-1916)
Teresio Olivelli (1916-1945)
Venanzio Maria Quadri (1916-1937)
William Gagnon, O.H. (1905-1972)

December 17, 2015
Enrico Hahn (1800-1882)
Giuseppe Ambrosoli (1923-1987)
Leonardo Lanzuela Martinez (1894-1976)

2016

January 21, 2016
Giuseppe Antonio Migliavacca, O.F.M. Cap. (1849-1909)
Maria Velotti (1826-1886)

March 3, 2016
Bernardo Mattio (1845-1914)
Bianca Piccolomini Clementini (1875-1959)
Enrico Battista Stanislao Verjus (1860-1892)
Giovanni Battista Quilici (1791-1844)
Maria Nieves Sánchez y Fernandez (1900-1978)
Quirico Pignalberi, O.F.M. Conv. (1891-1982)
Stephen Ferrando, S.D.B. (1895-1978)
Teodora Campostrini (1788-1860)

April 26, 2016
Caterina Carrasco Tenorio (1840-1917)
Ilia Corsaro (1897-1977)
Maria Consiglio dello Spirito Santo (1845-1900)
Maria Laura Baraggia (1851-1923)
María Montserrat Grases Garcia (1941-1959)
Sosio Del Prete (1885-1952)
Tommaso Choe Yang-Eop (1821-1861)
Venanzio Katarzyniec (1889-1921)

May 9, 2016
Rafaél Manuel Almansa Riaño, O.F.M. (1840-1927)

June 14, 2016
Antonín Cyril Stojan (1851-1923)
Bernardo de Vasconcelos (1902-1932)
Luigi Lo Verde (1910-1932)
Maria Elisa Oliver Molina (1869-1931)
Maria di Gesù dell'Amore Misericordioso (1899-1973)
Maria Guzmán Figueroa (1897-1967)
Vicente Garrido Pastor (1896-1975)

July 8, 2016
Alphonse Gallegos, O.A.R. (1931-1991)
Andrés García Acosta (1800-1853)
Giacomo Viale (1830-1912)
Giuseppe Marchetti, C.S. (1869-1896)
Maria Pia Notari (1847-1919)
Raffaele Sánchez García (1911-1973)

October 10, 2016
Agnese Pacifica Panas, O.S.C. Cap. (1896-1963)
Luis Zambrano Blanco (1909-1983)
Maria Teresa Spinelli (1789-1850)
Tiburcio Arnáiz Muñoz, S.J. (1865-1926)

December 1, 2016
Caterina Aurelia del Preziossimo Sangue (1833-1905)
Guglielmo Massaia, O.F.M. Cap. (1809-1889)
José Bau Burguet (1867-1932)
Leonia Maria Nastał (1903-1940)
Luce Rodríguez-Casanova y García San Miguel (1873-1949)
Mario Ciceri (1900-1945)
Nunzio Russo (1841-1906)
Suzanne Aubert (1835-1926)

December 21, 2016
Clelia Merloni (1861-1930)
Egidio Marcelli, C.P. (1874-1953)
Isidoro Zorzano Ledesma (1902-1943)
Jean-Baptiste Fouque (1851-1926)
Sebastiana Lladó Sala (1814-1899)

2017

January 20, 2017
Francesco Convertini, S.D.B. (1898-1976)
Giuseppe Beschin, O.F.M. (1880-1952)
Jan Tyranowski, O.C.D. (1901-1947)
Joseph Vandor, S.D.B. (1909-1979)
Juan Sáez Hurtado (1897-1982)
Raymundo Jardón Herrera (1887-1934)
Santina Maria Addolorata (1897-1981)

February 27, 2017
Antonio Provolo (1801-1842)
Antonio Repiso Martínez, S.J. (1856-1929)
Maria della Mercede Cabezas Terrero (1911-1993)
Maria Ripamonti (1909-1954)
Octavio Ortiz Arrieta, S.D.B. (1878-1958)
Pedro Herrero Rubio (1904-1978)
Vittorio Trancanelli (1944-1998)

March 23, 2017
Daniela Zanetta (1962-1986)
Elena Raparelli (1893-1970)
Felice Rossini, O.F.M. Cap. (1876-1924)

May 4, 2017
Alessandro Nottegar (1943-1986)
Edvige Carboni (1880-1952)
Elia Dalla Costa (1872-1961)
Francis-Xavier Nguyễn Văn Thuận (1928-2002)
Giovanna Meneghini (1868-1918)
Guadalupe Ortiz de Landázuri Fernández de Heredia (1916-1975)
Vincenzina Cusmano  (1826-1894)

June 16, 2017
Agostino Ernesto Castrillo, O.F.M. (1904-1955)
António José de Sousa Barroso (1854-1918)
Beniamino Filon, O.F.M. Cap. (1900-1948)
Giuseppina Operti (1871-1949)
Juan de Jesús López y González (1872-1950)
Maria Patlán Sánchez (1895-1970)

July 7, 2017
Ismael Perdomo Borrero (1872-1950)
Maria Elisabetta Mazza (1886-1950)
Maria Gargani, O.F.S. (1892-1973)
Paola de Jesus Gil Cano 1849-1913)
Piotr Kosiba, O.F.M. (1855-1939)

October 9, 2017
Aloiz Kashuba, O.F.M. Cap. (1910-1977)
Caroline Baron (1820-1882)
Donizetti Tavares de Lima (1882-1961)
Francesco Paolo Gravina (1800-1854)
Magín Morera y Feixas, S.F. (1908-1984)
Maria Llorença Llong (1463-1539)
Róża Czacka (1876-1961)

November 8, 2017
Bernhard II of Baden (1428-1458)
Giovanni Maoloni, O.F.M. Cap. (1873-1909)
Gregorio Fiorvanti, O.F.M. (1822-1894)
Pope John Paul I (1912-1978)
Teresa Fardella di Blasi (1867-1957)
Tomás Morales Pérez, S.J. (1908-1994)

December 18, 2017
Alonzo de Barcena, S.J. (1530-1597)
Luiza Maria Andaluz Langstroth Figueira de Sousa (1877-1973)
Mariantonia Samà (1875-1953)
Mariana de Manzanedo Herrera, O.A.R. (1568-1638)
Marianna Orsi (1842-1885)
Patrick Peyton, C.S.C. (1909-1992)
Paweł Klamans Smolikowski, C.R. (1849-1926)
Stefan Wyszyński (1901-1981)

2018

January 26, 2018
Ambrogio Grittani (1907-1951)
Madeleine Delbrêl (1904-1964)

March 6, 2018
Alessandra Sabattini (1961-1984)
Antonio Pietro Cortinovis, O.F.M. Cap. (1885-1984)
Bernard Łubieński, C.Ss.R. (1846-1933)
Giustina Schiapparoli (1819-1877)
Maria Antonella Bordoni, T.O.S.D. (1916-1978)
Maria Schiapparoli (1815-1882)

April 14, 2018
Costanza Ricci Curbastro (1856-1923)
Èlisabeth Bruyère (1818-1876)
Florenza Giovanna Profilio (1873-1956)
Justa Domínguez de Vidaurreta e Idoy (1875-1958)
Ludovico Longari, S.S.S. (1889-1963)
Manuel Nunes Formigão (1883-1958)
Maria Di Majo (1888-1967)
Varghese Payapilly (1876-1929)

May 19, 2018
Angela Maria Autsch, C.S.S.T. (1900-1944)
August Hlond, S.D.B. (1881-1948)
Coloma Antònia Martí y Valls,  (1860-1899)
Enrico Mauri (1883-1967)
Isora María del Tránsito Ocampo, O.P. (1841-1900)
Jean-Baptiste Berthier, M.S. (1840-1908)
John McAuliffe, S.C. (1886-1959)
Maria Edvige Zivelonghi,  (1919-1949)
Miguel Ángel Builes,  (1888-1971)
Pietro Uccelli,  (1874-1954)
Pio Dellepiane, O.M. (1904-1976)
Wilhelm Eberschweiler, S.J. (1837-1921)

July 5, 2018
Alexia González-Barros y González (1971-1985)
Carlo Acutis (1991-2006)
Giorgio La Pira (1904-1977)
Pietro Di Vitale (1916-1940)

November 7, 2018
Alfredo Obviar (1889-1978)
Carme Badosa Cuatrecasas (1878-1918)
Giovanni Ciresola (1902-1987)
Giovanni Jacono (1873-1957)
Ludovico Coccapani, O.F.S. (1849-1931)
Luigi Bosio (1909-1994)
Luigi Maria Ranieri, B. (1895-1918)
María Antonia Pereira Andrade, O.C.D. (1700-1760)
Michał Giedroyć, O.S.A. (1420-1485)
Pasqualina Luciani, C.P. (1920-1954)
Rafaela Veintemilla Villacis (1836-1918)

December 21, 2018
Angela Maria Boidi, C.P. (1908-1953)
Antonietta Giugliano (1909-1960)
Arcangelo Maria Biasi, O.F.M. Conv. (1897-1929)
Augustine John Ukken (1880-1956)
Carlo Tancredi Falletti di Barolo (1782-1838)
Doroteo Hernández Vera (1901-1991)
Filomena D'Urso (1909-1954)
Giuseppe Codicè (1838-1915)
Jan Pietraszko (1911-1988)
José Estanislao Zavala López, O.S.A. (1867-1947)
Józef Fordon, O.F.M. Conv. (1862-1927)

2019

January 15, 2019
Anna Kaworek (1872-1936)
María Consuelo Sanjurjo Santos, S.de.M. (1892-1973)

February 12, 2019
Ana Julia Duque Heckner (1898-1993)
Clorinda Letizia Formai (1876-1954)
Giovanni Battista Zuaboni (1880-1939)
József Mindszenty (1892-1975)
Manuel García Nieto, S.J. (1894-1974)

March 19, 2019
Francesco Maria di Francia (1853-1913)
Luisa Ferrari (1888-1984)
Maria Hueber (1653-1705)
Maria Teresa Camera (1818-1894)
Maria Teresa Gabrieli (1837-1908)

April 6, 2019
Augustin Arnaud Pagés, F.S.C. (1885-1966)
Carlo Cavina (1820-1880)
Damião de Bozzano, O.F.M. Cap. (1898-1997)
Gaetana Tolomeo (1936-1997)
Nelson Santana (1955-1964)
Pierina Lorenzina Giovanna Betrone, O.S.C. Cap. (1903-1946)
Raffaele da Sant'Elia a Pianisi, O.F.M. Cap. (1816-1901)

May 13, 2019
Carlo Salerio, M.E.P. (1827-1870)
Domingo Lázaro Castro, S.M. (1877-1935)
Hermínio Pinzetta, O.F.M. Cap. (1911-1972)
Giovanni Battista Pinardi (1880-1962)
Maria Giuseppina Amalia Sofia Iaconis (1867-1916)

June 11, 2019
Augustus Tolton (1854-1897)
Enzo Boschetti (1929-1993)
Felice Tantardini, P.I.M.E. (1898-1991)
Giovanni Nadiani, S.S.S. (1885-1940)
María Beatriz del Rosario Arroyo, O.P. (1884-1957)
Maria Paola Muzzeddu (1913-1971)
Santina Collani (1914-1956)

July 5, 2019
Ángel Riesco Carbajo (1902-1972)
Elyās Buțros al-Ḩwayek (1843-1931)
Étienne-Pierre Morlanne (1772-1862)
Francisca Fuentes, O.P. (1647-1711)
Giovanni Ferro, C.R.S. (1901-1992)
Vincenzo Lipani, O.F.M. Cap. (1842-1920)
Władysław Korniłowicz (1884-1946)

October 2, 2019
Augusto Cesare Bertazzoni (1876-1972)
Louis-Marie-Joseph Querbes (1793-1859)
María Natividad Sánchez Viloria O.S.C. (1905-1991)

November 28, 2019
Ana de Lobera Torres O.C.D. (1545-1621)
Georg Michael Wittmann (1760-1833)
Giacomo Bulgaro O.F.M. Conv. (1879-1967)
Maria Antonia Solimani (1688-1758)
Olinto Fedi (1841-1923)
Ovide Charlebois O.M.I. (1862-1933)

December 11, 2019
Américo Monteiro de Aguiar (1887-1956)
Carlo Angelo Sonzini (1878-1957)
Dinah Amorim Sch.P. (1917-1988)
Giulio Facibeni (1884-1958)
Tomás Suárez Fernández O.S.A. (1915-1949)
Vincenzo Maria Morelli C.R. (1741-1812)

2020

January 23, 2020
Carmen Caterina Bieno O.C.D. (1898-1966)
François-Léon Clergue O.F.M. Cap. (1825-1907)
Giovanni Tavelli (1386-1446)
Joaquim Masmitjà de Puig (1808-1886)
José Antonio Plancarte y Labastida (1840-1898)
José Pio Gurruchaga Castuariense (1881-1967)

February 21, 2020
Emilio Recchia C.S.S. (1888-1969)
Emilio Venturini C.O. (1842-1905)
Mario Hiriart Pulido (1931-1964)
Pirro Scavizzi (1884-1964)

May 5, 2020
Carmine De Palma (1876-1961)
Francesco Caruso (1879-1951)
Francisco Barrecheguren Montagut CSsR (1881-1957)
Maria Concepción Barrecheguren García (1905-1927)
Matteo Farina (1990-2009)

May 26, 2020
Melchior-Marie-Joseph de Marion Brésillac (1813-1859)

June 19, 2020
Gloria Esperanza Elizondo García (1908-1966)

July 10, 2020
Angelo Bonetta (1948-1963)
Eusebio Francesco Chini S.J. (1645-1711)
María Félix Torres (1907-2001)
Mariano José de Ibargüengoitia Zuloaga (1815-1888)

September 29, 2020
Francisca Pascual Doménech (1833-1903)
María Dolores Segarra Gestoso (1921-1959)

October 27, 2020
Celia Méndez y Delgado (1844-1908)
Roberto Giovanni C.S.S. (1903-1994)

November 23, 2020
Andrés Manjón y Manjón (1846-1923)
Alfonso Ugolini (1908-1999)
Clemenza Adelaide Cesira Ticchi (1887-1922)
Fiorina Cecchin  (1877-1925)
Fortunato Maria Farina (1881-1954)
Maria Carmela Giannetto (1902-1930)

December 21, 2020
Antonio Seghezzi (1906-1945)
Antonio Vicente González Suárez (1817-1851)
Bernardino Piccinelli O.S.M. (1905-1984)
Bernardo Antonini (1932-2002)
Ignác Stuchlý (1869-1953)
Rosella Stàltari (1951-1974)
Vasco de Quiroga (1470-1565)

2021

January 21, 2021
Adele Bonolis (1909-1980)
Elizabeth Prout (1820-1864)
Jérôme Lejeune (1926-1994)
Michele Arcangelo Maria Antonio Vinti (1893-1943)
Pasquale Canzii (1914-1930)
Ruggero Maria Caputo (1907-1980)
Santiago Masarnau Fernández (1805-1882)

February 20, 2021
Albino Alves da Cunha e Silva (1882-1973)
Alessandra Ghilardi S.d.P.I.P. (1931-1995)
Anna Clara Giovanna Baseggio O.S.A. (1752-1829)
Elisa Giambelluca (1941-1986)
Ignatius Spencer C.P. (1799-1864)
Luigia Rosina Rondi S.d.P.I.P. (1924-1995)
Teresa Belleri S.d.P.I.P. (1936-1995)

March 17, 2021
Anna Sorti S.d.P.I.P. (1947-1995)
Celestina Ossoli S.d.P.I.P. (1937-1995)
Clovis Veuthey O.F.M. Conv. (1896-1974)
Cosme Muñoz Pérez (1573-1636)
Maria Rosa Zorza S.d.P.I.P. (1944-1995)
Mercurio Maria Teresi (1742-1805)
Salvador Valera Parra (1816-1889)

April 24, 2021
Anfrosina Berardi (1920-1933)
Emanuele Stablum  (1895-1950)
Enrique Ernesto Shaw (1921-1962)
María de los Desamparados Portilla Crespo (1925-1996)
Pietro Marcellino Corradini (1658-1743)

May 22, 2021
Anna Mezzacapo O.C.D. (1914-1969)
Antonia Emma Lesino  (1897-1962)
Bálint Sándor (1904-1980)
Bernard Kryszkiewicz C.P. (1915-1945)
Felice Canelli (1880-1977)
Mariano Gazpio Ezcurra O.A.R. (1899-1989)

June 19, 2021
Aniela Róża Godecka (1861-1937)
María Aurelia Iglesias Fidalgo R.M.I. (1899-1982)
Orsola Donati (1849-1935)
Severino Fabriani (1792-1849)
Robert Schuman (1886-1963)

August 30, 2021
Enrichetta Beltrame Quattrocchi (1914-2012)
Maria Cristina Cella Mocellin (1969-1995)
Nicolò Cortese O.F.M. Conv. (1907-1944)

October 13, 2021
Diego Hernández González (1915-1976)
Elisabetta Martinez  (1905-1991)
Magdeleine Hutin (1898-1989)
Rocco Giocondo Pasquale Spoletini O.F.M. (1870-1951)

November 25, 2021
Antonio Bello (1905-1993)
Giorgio Guzzetta C.O. (1682-1756)
Juan San Pedro Ustárroz O.C.D. (1564-1615)
Maria Domenica Bottani  (1896-1970)
Natalina Bonardi (1864-1945)
Odette Vidal Cardoso (1930-1939)

December 13, 2021
Andrés Garrido Perales O.de.M. (1663-1728)
Bernardo Sartori M.C.C.J. (1897-1983)
Gaetano Antonio Vigevano O.F.M. Cap. (1825-1859)
Ludwika Banaś C.S.F.N. (1896-1966)

2022

January 20, 2022
Francesco Saverio Toppi O.F.M. Cap. (1925-2007)
Raffaella De Vincenti (1872-1936)
Teresa Borgarino D.C. (1880-1949)

February 18, 2022
Aldo Brienza O.C.D. (1923-1989)
Eduardo Francisco Pironio (1920-1998)
Juana Méndez Romero (1937-1990)
Maria da Conceição Santos (1907-1981)

April 9, 2022
Aurora Calvo Hernández Agero (1901-1933)
Costantino Mazzieri O.F.M. Conv. (1889-1983)
Fulgenzio Elorza Legaristi C.P. (1899-1966)
Kazimiera Gruszczyńska (1848-1927)
Lucia Noiret (1832-1889)
Maria Aristea Ceccarelli Bernacchia (1883-1971)
Rozalia Celak (1901-1944)

May 21, 2022
Alfredo Morganti O.F.M (1886-1969)
Clemente Recalcati O.F.M. Cap. (1868-1913)
Janina Woynarowska (1923-1979)
José Torres Padilla (1811-1878)
Luigi Sodo (1811-1895)
Mariana Allsopp González-Manrique (1854-1933)
Teofilo Camomot (1914-1988)

August 5, 2022
Giovanni Giuseppe Bonzi O.F.M. Cap. (1898-1969)
Jesús Antonio Gómez y Gómez (1895-1971)
Juan Sánchez Hernández (1902-1975)
Maria Celine Kannanaikal  (1931-1957)
Vítor Coelho de Almeida C.Ss.R. (1899-1987)

December 17, 2022
Aleksander Woźny (1910-1983)
Alessia Antonia Guaini (1902-1994)
Ancilla Caterina Isacchi (1857-1934)
Franz de Castro Holzwarth (1942-1981)
Giulia Bonifacio (1863-1926)
Ignacy Posadzy (1898-1984)
José Marcos Figueróa Umpierrez S.J. (1865-1942)
Luisa Guidotti Mistrali (1932-1979)
Magdalena Aulina Saurina (1897-1956)
Margherita Diomira Crispi (1879-1974)
Martin Benedict O.F.M. Conv. (1931-1986)
Matteo Ricci S.J. (1552-1610)
Teresa Veronesi M.I.N. (1870-1950)
Ugo De Blasi (1918-1982)

2023

January 19, 2023
Bertilla Antoniazzi (1944-1964)
Gaetano Francesco Mauro (1888-1969)
Giovanni Barra (1914-1975)
Maria Allegri (1651-1677)
Miguel Costa y Llobera (1854-1922)
Vicente López de Uralde Lazcano S.M. (1894-1990)

February 23, 2023
Albertina Violi Zirondoli (1901-1972)
Aloísio Sebastião Boeing S.C.I. (1913-2006)
Anna Teresa Caterina Lussana (1852-1935)
Francisca Ana María Alcover Morell (1912-1954)
Giulio Bocci O.F.M. Cap. (1885-1974)

See also
 List of people declared venerable by Pope John XXIII
 List of people declared venerable by Pope Paul VI
 List of people declared venerable by Pope John Paul II
 List of people declared venerable by Pope Benedict XVI

External links
Hagiography Circle
Patron Saints Index

People declared venerable by Pope Francis
People declared venerable by Pope Francis
Declared Venerable By Pope Francis